Five on a Hike Together is the tenth novel in the Famous Five series by Enid Blyton. It was first published in 1951.

Plot
Siblings Julian and Dick Kirrin have been given a four-day weekend from their boarding school, coinciding with the mid-term break of their sister Anne and cousin George, so they arrange to go hiking together. Julian plans to spend their first night at a bed and breakfast called Blue Pond Farm. On the way, George's dog, Timmy, injures his leg when being pulled out of a rabbit burrow. Consequently, Julian and George go to the residence of Mr. Gaston, a local expert on animals, while Dick and Anne head for Blue Pond Farm. Mr. Gaston treats Timmy's injured leg and Mrs. Gaston then insists Julian and George stay for a meal, after which they walk to Blue Pond Farm.

Dick and Anne have taken a wrong turn and are confused by ringing bells. They head toward a light, where they encounter an elderly deaf woman. Assuming they have reached Blue Pond Farmhouse, Dick and Anne go in but the woman, Mrs. Taggart, tells them to leave because her son would not accept them. She eventually agrees to let Anne sleep in a loft, whilst Dick makes do with sleeping in a barn.

During the night, Dick is awakened by a voice calling his name. He is given a cryptic message, "Two Trees. Gloomy Water. Saucy Jane. And Maggie knows too". He is also given a piece of paper. The next morning, Mrs. Taggart’s son is back and chases Dick away. He and Anne get directions to Blue Pond Farmhouse. Reunited with Julian and George for breakfast, Dick and Anne tell the story of the bells and the message. Julian says the bells signaled an escape from a local prison, and the escaped prisoner meant to meet “Dirty Dick” Taggart at the barn.

The children report the incident to a village policeman, but he accuses them of lying and informs them the escapee has been caught. Julian decides they should hike to a ruined house called Two-Trees, located at Gloomy Water, a marshy lake higher on the moors. That night, Julian deduces that Dick's message is instructions to find stolen goods from a robbery by a prisoner called Nailer and that the loot is hidden in a boat called the Saucy Jane.

The following day, Maggie and Dirty Dick come to Gloomy Water to search for the loot and are annoyed to see the children there. The Five paddle into the lake on a raft but do not find anything. They conclude that “Tall Stone”, one of the clues written on the paper given to Dick, is a landmark that will help guide them to the location of the Saucy Jane. The next morning, they locate the Saucy Jane at the bottom of the lake, at which point Maggie and Dirty Dick appear in a boat but row back to shore after Julian says the children will be returning to school tomorrow. Julian dives to the bottom of the lake and finds a bag of loot, but cannot remove it. The Five return on the raft near midnight, and Julian and Dick dive to the boat to haul up the loot, which is jewellery stolen from the Queen of Fallonia.

After recovering the jewels, the Five evade Maggie and Dick and walk to the village of Reebles to call Mr. Gaston, who then drives them to a police station, where the children hand over the jewels and tell their story. Maggie and Dirty Dick, stuck in the marshland, are arrested. The police promise to drive the children back to their schools by a 3pm deadline.

External links
Enid Blyton Society page
Five On A Hike Together at www.enidblyton.net

Adaptations
 The gamebook The Sinister Lake Game (1984) was based on this novel.

1951 British novels
Hodder & Stoughton books
Famous Five novels
1951 children's books